Angel's Egg is a 1985 original video animation by Mamoru Oshii and Yoshitaka Amano.

Angel's Egg may also refer to:
Angel's Egg (album), a 1973 album by Gong
The Angel's Egg, a 1993 novel by Yuka Murayama
The Angel's Egg, a 2006 film directed by Shin Togashi and based on the novel by Yuka Murayama